Hadi Tajik (born 7 August 1992) is an Iranian professional kabaddi player represents Iran in international matches and also currently plays for Puneri Paltan in the Indian Pro Kabaddi League.

Career 
He was part of the Iranian team which claimed silver in the men's team event at the 2014 Asian Games. He narrowly missed out to participate at the 2018 Asian Games where historically Iran claimed gold medal for the first time. However he made into the national side for the 2018 Dubai Kabaddi Masters and claimed silver medal with the team after losing to rivals India by 44-26 in the final.

Pro Kabaddi League 

He made his PKL debut for U Mumba in the third season which was held in 2016. Hadi was bought by UP Yoddha for the fifth season of the Pro Kabaddi League. He again returned to the U Mumba side for the sixth season. He was signed by Puneri Paltan for the 2019 Pro Kabaddi League.

References

External links
 Hadi Tajik at GlobalSportsArchive
 Hadi Tajik at KabbadiAdda

1992 births
Living people
Iranian kabaddi players
Kabaddi players at the 2014 Asian Games
Medalists at the 2014 Asian Games
Asian Games silver medalists for Iran
Asian Games medalists in kabaddi
Pro Kabaddi League players